Anne-Solenne Hatte is a film actress of French and Vietnamese parentage.

Filmography

Film
Girls with Balls (2018)
Lockout (2012)
Callback (2010)
Ocean's Twelve (2004)
Alborada (2022)

TV
Duval et Moretti (2008)
Hard (2008)
Strike Back: Legacy (2015)

See also
Lockout

References

External links

Anne-Solenne Hatte at Wikipedia France

Actresses of Vietnamese descent
French television actresses
French film actresses
Living people
French people of Vietnamese descent
21st-century French actresses
Year of birth missing (living people)
Place of birth missing (living people)